The Turtle Bay Championship was a golf tournament on the Champions Tour from 1987 to 2008. The tournament was founded in 1987 as the GTE Kaanapali Classic when it was played at Kāʻanapali on the island of Maui.

History
It was played annually in January at the Turtle Bay Resort near Kahuku, Hawaii at The Palmer Course from 2001 through 2008.
The purse for the 2008 tournament was US$1,600,000, with $240,000 going to the winner.

Winners
Turtle Bay Championship
2008 Jerry Pate
2007 Fred Funk
2006 Loren Roberts
2005 Hale Irwin
2004 No tournament
2003 Hale Irwin
2002 Hale Irwin
2001 Hale Irwin

EMC Kaanapali Classic
2000 Hale Irwin
1999 Bruce Fleisher
1998 Jay Sigel

Hyatt Regency Maui Kaanapali Classic
1997 Hale Irwin
1996 Bob Charles
1995 Bob Charles
1994 Bob Murphy

Ping Kaanapali Classic
1993 George Archer

Kaanapali Classic
1992 Tommy Aaron

First Development Kaanapali Classic
1991 Jim Colbert

GTE Kaanapali Classic
1990 Bob Charles
1989 Don Bies
1988 Don Bies
1987 Orville Moody

Source:

References

External links
PGATOUR.com Tournament website

Former PGA Tour Champions events
Golf in Hawaii
Recurring sporting events established in 1987
Recurring sporting events disestablished in 2008
1987 establishments in Hawaii
2008 disestablishments in Hawaii
Defunct sports competitions in the United States